Cees van Dongen (1932 – 23 December 2011) was a Grand Prix motorcycle road racer from the Netherlands.

Van Dongen was born in Rotterdam.  His best season was in 1969 when he won the 125cc Spanish Grand Prix and finished the season in third place behind Dave Simmonds and Dieter Braun.

Career statistics

Grand Prix motorcycle racing

Races by year
(key) (Races in bold indicate pole position) (Races in italics indicate fastest lap)

References

1932 births
2011 deaths
Dutch motorcycle racers
50cc World Championship riders
125cc World Championship riders
Sportspeople from Rotterdam
20th-century Dutch people